Flavio Cipolla and Marcel Granollers were the defending champions, however he didn't defend their title.
Rubén Ramírez Hidalgo and Santiago Ventura won in the final 7–6(1), 6–2, against Pablo Cuevas and Luis Horna.

Seeds

Draw

Draw

Sources
 Main Draw

Open Barletta - Citta della Disfida - Doubles
2009 Doubles